Berumbur is a municipality in the district of Aurich, in Lower Saxony, Germany.

In 2004, the municipality had approximately 2,400 inhabitants and covers an area of 6.42 square kilometers.

The municipality includes the districts Berumbur, Berum, Kleinheide, Holzdorf and Blandorf.

There are many fishing lakes, two in Berumbur directly.  The most famous lake is a great Kiessee, used for bathing (at one's own risk).

References

Towns and villages in East Frisia
Aurich (district)